Mikhail Shatrov (1932-2010) was a Soviet playwright. In 1958 he was admitted to the Union of Soviet Writers. Member of the CPSU since 1961. In a series of historical plays, he shook up the genre of Leniniana. (Faina Ranevskaya sarcastically remarked: "Shatrov - this is the Krupskaya of our days".)

His plays are often based on historical events. "The Bolsheviks" is based on the true story of Fanny Kaplan's attempt to assassinate Vladimir Lenin. The play "The Peace Treaty of Brest-Litovsk" was initially banned by the regime in the USSR due to its depiction of Lenin and was approved for publication only in 1987, 25 years after it was written. In 1988 an all-Russian cast toured Europe performing "The Peace Treaty of Brest-Litovsk"; in 1990 the company toured in the US as well.

Mikhail Shatrov died in Moscow at the 79th year of his life from a heart attack in his apartment in the House on the Embankment. He was buried at the Troyekurovskoye Cemetery.

References

1932 births
2010 deaths
Writers from Moscow
Russian male dramatists and playwrights
Burials in Troyekurovskoye Cemetery
Recipients of the USSR State Prize
Communist Party of the Soviet Union members
Recipients of the Order of Friendship of Peoples